Jack Fisher (22 January 1922 – 10 July 2015) was an Australian rules footballer who played with Hawthorn in the Victorian Football League (VFL).

Notes

External links 

1922 births
2015 deaths
Australian rules footballers from Victoria (Australia)
Hawthorn Football Club players